Anarsia nigrimacula is a moth of the family Gelechiidae. It was described by Anthonie Johannes Theodorus Janse in 1949. It is found in South Africa.

References

Endemic moths of South Africa
nigrimacula
Moths described in 1949
Moths of Africa